is a passenger railway station located in the city of Anan, Tokushima Prefecture, Japan. It is operated by JR Shikoku and has the station number "M15".

Lines

Layout
The station consists of two opposed side platforms serving two tracks. The station building is unstaffed and serves only as a waiting room. Access to the opposite platform is by means of a level crossing with ramps at both ends. A siding branches off track 1 and ends near the station building.

Platforms

Adjacent stations

History
On 1 April 1987, with the privatization of Japanese National Railways (JNR), the successor of JGR, JR Shikoku took over control of the station.

Passenger statistics
In fiscal 2019, the station was used by an average of 119 passengers daily

Surrounding area
Anan City Hall Kuwano Resident Center
Anan City Kuwano Elementary School
Anan Municipal Anan Daini Junior High School

See also
List of railway stations in Japan

References

External links

 JR Shikoku timetable

Railway stations in Tokushima Prefecture
Railway stations in Japan opened in 1936
Anan, Tokushima